Night Owl may refer to:
An owl
Night owl (person), a person who is most active or creative during the night
Night owl (person), a name of a Mandalorian who is previously from the Death Watch , a subset of assassins
Night Owl (film), a 1993 film by Jeffrey Arsenault
"Night Owl", a Bangkok Post newspaper column by Bernard Trink
Night Owl (album), a 1979 album by Gerry Rafferty
"Night Owl" (Gerry Rafferty song), 1979 
"Night Owl" (James Taylor song), 1966 song recorded by James Taylor, Carly Simon and others
Night Owl (train), a former Amtrak passenger train between Boston and Washington, D.C.
The Night Owl (album), 1987 Gregg Karukas album
The Night Owl (1926 film), American silent film
The Night Owl (2022 film), a South Korean period thriller drama film
Night Owl Cinematics, Singaporean YouTube channel and media company
NightOwl Convenience Stores, Australian store chain
Keyfax Nite-Owl, a service that provided news, weather, sports, and entertainment information on WFLD Channel 32 in Chicago
 "Night Owl", a song by We Stood Like Kings
The Night Owl Cafe, a Greenwich Village music club which is referenced in the 1967 song "Creeque Alley"

Night Owls may refer to:
The Night Owls (song), a song by Little River Band from the 1981 album Time Exposure
Night Owls (vocal group), a Vassar College a cappella group
Night Owls (1928 film), a Krazy Kat animated film
Night Owls (1930 film), a Laurel and Hardy film
Night Owls (2015 film), starring Adam Pally and Rosa Salazar
Night Owls (album), a 1990 album by Vaya Con Dios
Night Owls, a 2015 novel by Jenn Bennett
The Night Owls (webcomic), a line of comics by Zuda comics
Nanaimo NightOwls, baseball team in the West Coast League

See also
Nite Owl, a comic book character